The 1974 Miami Dolphins season was the franchise's 5th season in the National Football League, the 9th overall, and the 5th under head coach Don Shula. The team entered the 1974 season as two-time defending Super Bowl champions. They could not improve on their 12-2 record from last season and finished 11-3. Despite this, the Dolphins finished first in the AFC East for the fourth consecutive season, and they finished with the second best record in the NFL. In the playoffs, the Raiders beat the Dolphins in the AFC Divisional Playoff Game in the famous "Sea of Hands" game.

Offseason

NFL Draft

Personnel

Staff

Roster

Regular season

Schedule

Standings

Playoffs

AFC Divisional Playoff

References

External links
 1974 Miami Dolphins at Pro-Football-Reference.com

Miami
Miami Dolphins seasons
AFC East championship seasons
Miami Dolphins